Cold on the Shoulder may refer to:

 Cold on the Shoulder (Gordon Lightfoot album), 1975
 Cold on the Shoulder (Tony Rice album), 1983